Annie Laurie is a 1936 British comedy film directed by Walter Tennyson and starring Will Fyffe, Polly Ward and Bruce Seton. The film takes its name from, but is not based on, the traditional Scottish song Annie Laurie. It was made at Cricklewood Studios in London.

Cast
 Will Fyffe as Will Laurie
 Polly Ward as Annie Laurie
 Bruce Seton as Jamie Turner
 Vivienne Chatterton as Maggie Laurie
 Romilly Lunge as John Anderson
 Percy Walsh as Alec Laurie
 Frederick Culley as Robert Anderson
 Evelyn Barnard as Elspeth McAlpine
 Quentin McPhearson as Small

References

Bibliography
 Low, Rachael. Filmmaking in 1930s Britain. George Allen & Unwin, 1985.
 Wood, Linda. British Films, 1927-1939. British Film Institute, 1986

External links

1936 films
1936 comedy films
British comedy films
Films shot at Cricklewood Studios
Films directed by Walter Tennyson
British black-and-white films
1930s English-language films
1930s British films